Guillermo Barros Schelotto (born 4 May 1973) is an Argentine football manager and former forward who currently manages the Paraguay national team.

Barros Schelotto played 16 years of his professional career in the Argentine Primera División (6 with Gimnasia La Plata and 10 with Boca Juniors). With these two teams, he won a total 17 official titles (one with Gimnasia and 16 with Boca).

In 2007, Barros Schelotto left Boca Juniors for Columbus Crew in the Major League Soccer, his first move outside his native country. The forward won three league and cup titles with Columbus Crew, as well as two individual awards, before moving back to Gimnasia La Plata in 2011.

Playing career

Club

Argentina
Born with a twin brother, Gustavo, Barros Schelotto was hence nicknamed El Mellizo ("the twin"). He started playing professionally at the end of 1991 with his hometown team Gimnasia y Esgrima de La Plata, where he scored 45 goals in 181 matches in five seasons and in 1993 won the AFA Centenario Cup. On 14 September 1997 he transferred to Primera División Argentina powerhouse Boca Juniors, for whom he played for almost 10 years. He was considered an idol by Boca fans and in his later years at the club showed his experience whenever he stepped on the pitch. Barros Schelotto remains one of Boca's top scorers in international matches with 25 goals, with just one goal behind former teammate Martín Palermo.

In 1996, he was offered to play for River Plate, but after club icon Enzo Francescoli was not happy with the potential signing, the deal collapsed. In mid-1997, Boca Juniors showed interest for him and his brother Gustavo. It was like that that Barros Schelotto twins arrived to Boca teaming up to a former rival: Martín Palermo, Gimnasia's archrival Estudiantes de La Plata former player. The three of them were repeatedly recommended to Boca by Diego Maradona, who was playing his last season for the Buenos Aires team, retiring on October the same year. Once in Boca, he made his debut as a substitute for Claudio Caniggia, scoring against Newell's Old Boys in a 2–1 victory.

With Carlos Bianchi as Boca Juniors' coach, Barros Schelotto got his traditional 7 shirt and kept it until 2006–07 season. He and former rival Martin Palermo became a successful attacking duo, who highly contributed in the 1998–99 title-winning season. He missed the 2001 and 2003 clubs international achievements due to injuries. In 2003, he was a key piece in the winning Copa Libertadores side, with his peak performance at the Round of 16 match against Brazilian team Paysandú, where he scored a hat-trick and assisted Marcelo Delgado's goal. In the second half of 2003 he again suffered from injuries and could only play for 46 minutes in the Copa Intercontinental winning match against AC Milan, when he replaced Carlos Tevez. With Alfio Basile as Boca coach, his participation in the first team was gradually lowering. He even was out of some first team matches and had to play for the second team to maintain his performance level. He scored 87 goals in 302 games for Boca Juniors.

United States

Close to the end of his contract with Boca in 2007, it was rumored that he would leave the club to join a team where he would get more playing time. On 19 April 2007 he announced he would sign a two-year contract with Major League Soccer's Columbus Crew.

Barros Schelotto made his debut in the United States on 5 May, as a 75th-minute replacement, as the Crew lost the match against Kansas City Wizards 1–0. On 12 May 2007 he made his home debut in a game against Chivas USA. The game was tied 1–1, and Schelotto had the assist for the Crew goal. Barros Schelotto quickly became a team leader and fan favorite in Columbus, helping to turn their season around. In the 2007 season he led the team with 11 assists, also adding 5 goals, in 22 games.

Barros Schelotto had a strong MLS season in 2008, being chosen Player of the week four times, Player of the month once, and recording 19 assists and 7 goals during the regular season. He was awarded the Major League Soccer MVP on 20 November 2008. Barros Schelotto capped off his 2008 MLS campaign with an MVP performance in the 2008 MLS Cup which Columbus won 3–1 against New York Red Bulls at the Home Depot Center on 23 November 2008, behind Barros Schelotto's 3 assists. For his performance in the 2008 MLS season in which he displayed his leadership, vision, passing, scoring and positioning; Barros Schelotto was named Sports Illustrated Latino's Sportsman of the Year He became the Crew's first ever Designated Player on 2 December 2008.

On 16 November 2010, Barros Schelotto's option was not picked up by the team, along with several other veterans of the club, effectively ending his career in Columbus. Barros Schelotto elected to participate in the 2010 MLS Re-Entry Draft and became a free agent in Major League Soccer when he was not selected in the Re-Entry draft.

Return to Argentina

Barros Schelotto had decided to retire but on 13 January 2011, he went back on that decision and decided to see out his career with his childhood club Gimnasia y Esgrima La Plata. He returned 14 years after leaving the club in 1997 to join Boca Juniors. Barros Schelotto declined to accept a wage from the club and as such he was contracted unpaid, "ad honorem".
 
Barros Schelotto's spell at the club lasted 6 months. In that time he played 17 matches, primarily as a winger, and scored 3 goals. His last goal came against Boca Juniors, this was not only his last goal for Gimnasia but also his 110th goal in the Primera Division. As a result of his contributions to the club and his playing abilities, Barros Schelotto is revered by the fans as a club great.

International
Barros Schelotto obtained ten senior caps for the Argentina national football team between 1995 and 1999, and also won the gold medal in the under-23 Panamerican Games in 1995.

Coaching career
Following his retirement in 2011, he and fellow Argentine, Gino Padula, established SP Soccer Academy in Westerville, Ohio.

Lanús
In July 2012, Barros Schelotto took his first job as a manager, taking charge of Club Atlético Lanús replacing former manager Gabriel Schürrer.

Palermo
On 11 January 2016, Barros Schelotto was named as new coach of Italian side Palermo after his contract with Lanús had ended. Due to bureaucratic issues related to his appointment as head coach, however, Palermo was forced a few days later to hire Giovanni Tedesco, who already had the required coaching badges, as new "official" head coach, with Schelotto working alongside him and sitting on the bench during league games as "team manager". On 10 February 2016, Palermo confirmed Schelotto's resignation from his role at the club after UEFA refused to hand him a coaching badge.

Boca Juniors
On 1 March 2016, Barros Schelotto signed with his former club Boca Juniors.

With Barros Schelotto at the helm, Boca reached the semifinals of the 2016 Copa Libertadores, and won the 2016–17 Argentine Primera División despite many issues, including club legend Carlos Tevez's exit with a multi-million-dollar deal to Shanghai Shenhua. Barros Schelotto's Boca also won the 2017–18 Argentine Primera División.

Despite the back-to-back league titles, the club lost the 2018 Copa Libertadores finals against rivals River Plate, and a few days later Boca Juniors president Daniel Angelici decided not to renovate his contract for 2019.

LA Galaxy
On 2 January 2019, MLS side LA Galaxy named Barros Schelotto as their new head coach. On 29 October 2020, Barros Schelotto was relieved of his duties as head coach.

Paraguay national team
On 20 October 2021, Barros Schelotto is confirmed as coach of the Paraguay national football team.

Personal life
Barros Schelotto's twin brother, Gustavo, was a teammate of his at Gimnasia La Plata, and also briefly at Boca Juniors. Since 2012, they work together with Guillermo as head coach and Gustavo as assistant coach. Barros Schelotto and his wife, Matilde, have three young sons, Máximo, Nicolás, and Santiago. His nephews Juan, Salvador, and Tomás Cataldi and Bautista Barros Schelotto are footballers. His father, Hugo Barros Schelotto, was one of Gimnasia y Esgrima's presidents in the 1980s.

Career statistics

Coaching statistics

Honours

Player
Argentina
Pan American Games: 1995

Gimnasia y Esgrima La Plata
Copa Centenario de la AFA: 1993

Boca Juniors
Copa Libertadores (4): 2000, 2001, 2003, 2007
Copa Sudamericana (2): 2004, 2005
Recopa Sudamericana (2): 2005, 2006
Primera División (6): 1998 Apertura, 1999 Clausura, 2000 Apertura, 2003 Apertura, 2005 Apertura, 2006 Clausura
Intercontinental Cup (2): 2000, 2003

Columbus Crew
MLS Cup: 2008
Supporters' Shield (2): 2008, 2009
Eastern Conference (Playoffs): 2008
Eastern Conference (Regular season) (2): 2008, 2009

Individual
MLS Player of the Month: July 2007, August 2008, June 2009
Major League Soccer MVP: 2008
MLS Best XI: 2007, 2008
MLS Cup MVP: 2008

Manager
Lanús
Copa Sudamericana: 2013

Boca Juniors
Primera División (2): 2016–17, 2017–18

References

External links

Footballdatabase profile and statistics
Schelotto & Padula Soccer Academy Official Website

1973 births
Living people
Footballers from La Plata
Argentine sportspeople of Italian descent
Argentine expatriate sportspeople in the United States
Argentine footballers
Argentine expatriate footballers
Association football wingers
Boca Juniors footballers
Columbus Crew players
Club de Gimnasia y Esgrima La Plata footballers
Argentine Primera División players
Expatriate soccer players in the United States
Argentine expatriate sportspeople in Italy
Expatriate football managers in Italy
Club Atlético Lanús managers
Boca Juniors managers
LA Galaxy coaches
Argentina international footballers
1999 Copa América players
Argentine twins
Twin sportspeople
Major League Soccer players
Major League Soccer All-Stars
Designated Players (MLS)
Pan American Games gold medalists for Argentina
Pan American Games medalists in football
Copa Libertadores-winning players
Footballers at the 1995 Pan American Games
Argentine football managers
Medalists at the 1995 Pan American Games
Barros Schelotto/Cataldi family
Paraguay national football team managers